Tomáš Pospíšil (born 30 January 1991) is a professional Czech football player who currently plays for Narrabeen Football Club. He has also represented his country at youth level. He moved from Dukla Prague on loan to Pardubice in the winter break of the 2012–13 season, extending his loan in July 2013.

Career statistics

| Narrabeen Football

References

External links
 
 
 Guardian Football

Living people
1991 births
Czech footballers
Czech Republic youth international footballers
Czech First League players
FK Dukla Prague players
FK Baník Most players
Association football defenders